The 2002 Ukrainian Cup Final was a football match that took place at the NSC Olimpiyskiy on May 26, 2002. The match was the 11th Ukrainian Cup Final and it was contested by Shakhtar Donetsk and Dynamo Kyiv. The 2002 Ukrainian Cup Final was the eleventh to be held in the Ukrainian capital Kyiv. Shakhtar won by three goals to two.

Match details

References

External links 
 Calendar of Matches - Schedule of the 2001-02 Ukrainian Cup on the Ukrainian Soccer History web-site (ukrsoccerhistory.com). 

Cup Final
Ukrainian Cup finals
Ukrainian Cup Final 2002
Ukrainian Cup Final 2002
Ukrainian Cup Final 2002